The 2018 Gasparilla Bowl was a college football bowl game played on December 20, 2018, with kickoff scheduled for 8:00 p.m. EST. It was the 11th edition of the game originally known as the St. Petersburg Bowl and renamed before its 2017 playing as the Gasparilla Bowl, and one of the 2018–19 bowl games concluding the 2018 FBS football season. Sponsored by lawn mower manufacturing company Bad Boy Mowers, the game was officially known as the Bad Boy Mowers Gasparilla Bowl.

This was the first time for the bowl to be played at Raymond James Stadium in Tampa, as the prior 10 editions of the bowl were held at Tropicana Field in nearby St. Petersburg.

Teams
The game featured the Marshall Thundering Herd of Conference USA (C-USA) against the South Florida Bulls of the American Athletic Conference (AAC) in their first meeting against each other.

Marshall Thundering Herd

Marshall received and accepted a bid to the Gasparilla Bowl on December 2. The Thundering Herd entered the bowl with an 8–4 record (6–2 C-USA). The game was the team's 15th overall bowl appearance and third appearance in the Gasparilla Bowl. The Herd previously played in the 2011 edition and 2015 edition, winning against FIU and Connecticut, respectively.

South Florida Bulls

South Florida received and accepted a bid to the Gasparilla Bowl on December 2. The Bulls entered the bowl with a 7–5 record (3–5 AAC), having lost their final five regular season games. The game was the team's 10th overall bowl appearance and second appearance in the Gasparilla Bowl. The Bulls previously played in the 2008 edition, winning against Memphis.

Game summary

Scoring summary

Statistics

Source:

References

External links
 
Box score at ESPN

Gasparilla Bowl
Gasparilla Bowl
Gasparilla Bowl
Gasparilla Bowl
Marshall Thundering Herd football bowl games
South Florida Bulls football bowl games